Your Own Back Yard is a 1925 American short silent comedy film directed by Robert F. McGowan. It was the 43rd Our Gang short subject released.

Cast

The Gang
 Allen Hoskins - Farina
 Joe Cobb - Joe
 Jackie Condon - Jackie
 Mickey Daniels - Mickey
 Johnny Downs - Johnny
 Mary Kornman - Mary

Additional cast
 Harry Bowen - Donor
 William Gillespie - Man in quarrelsome couple
 Charles Oelze - Man with samples
 Fay Wray - Woman in quarrelsome couple
 Pal the Dog as himself
 Dinah the Mule as herself

See also
 Our Gang filmography

References

External links

1925 films
1925 comedy films
1925 short films
American silent short films
American black-and-white films
Films directed by Robert F. McGowan
Films with screenplays by H. M. Walker
Hal Roach Studios short films
Our Gang films
1920s American films
Silent American comedy films